Nyiri Desert, also called The Nyika, Taru Desert,  Taru desert, is a desert in southern Kenya. It is located east of Lake Magadi and between Amboseli, Tsavo West and Nairobi National Parks. A high proportion of Kajiado County's land area is covered by the Nyiri Desert. Its aridity is caused by the rain shadow of Mount Kilimanjaro.

References

 Deserts of Kenya
 Kajiado County
 Landforms of Rift Valley Province